In human anatomy, the inferior mesenteric vein (IMV) is a blood vessel that drains blood from the large intestine.  It usually terminates when reaching the splenic vein, which goes on to form the portal vein with the superior mesenteric vein (SMV).

Structure 
The inferior mesenteric vein merges with the splenic vein, posterior to the middle of the body of the pancreas. The splenic vein then merges with the superior mesenteric vein to form the portal vein.

Tributaries 
Tributaries of the inferior mesenteric vein drain the large intestine, sigmoid colon and rectum. These include:
 left colic vein
 sigmoid veins 
 superior rectal vein
 rectosigmoid veins

Variation 
Anatomical variations include the inferior mesenteric vein draining into the confluence of the superior mesenteric vein and splenic vein and the inferior mesenteric vein draining in the superior mesenteric vein.

Clinical significance 
The inferior mesenteric vein may be damaged during surgery on the body and tail of the pancreas. If a serious laceration occurs, the inferior mesenteric vein may be ligated, as other veins can drain the large intestine.

Additional images

References

External links
 
  - "Intestines and Pancreas: Tributaries of Inferior Mesenteric Vein"
 
 

Veins of the torso